Rigetti Computing is a Berkeley, California-based developer of quantum integrated circuits used for quantum computers. The company also develops a cloud platform called Forest that enables programmers to write quantum algorithms.

History
Rigetti Computing was founded in 2013 by Chad Rigetti, a physicist who previously worked on quantum computers at IBM, and studied under noted Yale quantum scientist Michel Devoret.  The company emerged from startup incubator Y Combinator in 2014 as a so-called "spaceshot" company. The company also went through enterprise revenue-focused The Alchemist Accelerator in 2014.

By February 2016, the company had begun testing a three-qubit (quantum bit) chip made using aluminum circuits on a silicon wafer. In March, the company raised Series A funding of US$24 million in a round led by Andreessen Horowitz.  In November, the company raised Series B funding of $40 million in a round led by investment firm Vy Capital, along with additional funding from Andreessen Horowitz and other investors.  Y Combinator was a smaller investor in both rounds.

By Spring of 2017, the company was testing eight-qubit computers, and in June, the company announced the public beta availability of a quantum cloud computing platform called Forest 1.0, which allows developers to write quantum algorithms.

In October of 2021, it was announced that the company plans to go public via a SPAC merger, with estimated valuation around $1.5 billion. This process will allow the company to raise an addition $458 million in funding, in addition to the $200 million raised previously. With this funding, Rigetti plans to scale its systems from 80 qubits to 1,000 qubits by 2024, and to 4,000 by 2026. The SPAC deal closed on 2 March, 2022, and the company began trading on the NASDAQ.

Products and technology
Rigetti Computing is a full-stack quantum computing company, a term that indicates that the company designs and fabricates quantum chips, integrates them with a controlling architecture, and develops software for programmers to use to build algorithms for the chips.

Forest cloud computing platform

The company hosts a cloud computing platform called Forest, which gives developers access to quantum processors so they can write quantum algorithms for testing purposes. The computing platform is based on a custom instruction language the company developed called Quil, which stands for Quantum Instruction Language.  Quil facilitates hybrid quantum/classical computing, and programs can be built and executed using open source Python tools. As of June 2017, the platform allows coders to write quantum algorithms for a simulation of a quantum chip with 36 qubits.

Fab-1
The company operates a rapid prototyping fabrication ("fab") lab called Fab-1, designed to quickly create integrated circuits.  Lab engineers design and generate experimental designs for 3D-integrated quantum circuits for qubit-based quantum hardware.

Recognition
The company was recognized by X-Prize founder Peter Diamandis as being one of the three leaders in the quantum computing space, along with IBM and Google.  MIT Technology Review named the company one of the 50 smartest companies of 2017.

Locations
Rigetti Computing is headquartered in Berkeley, California, where it hosts developmental systems and cooling equipment. The company also operates its Fab-1 manufacturing facility in nearby Fremont.

References

External links
 

Computer companies of the United States
Quantum information science
Companies based in Berkeley, California
American companies established in 2013
Computer companies established in 2013
2013 establishments in California
Companies listed on the Nasdaq
Special-purpose acquisition companies